The Hochfeiler is a mountain, 3,510 metres high, and the highest peak in the Zillertal Alps on the border between Tyrol, Austria, and South Tyrol, Italy.

The normal route to the summit
Hochfeiler (Gran Pilastro) is at the Austrian-Italian border, and the two sides of the mountain are very different. The Austrian side is completely under glacier. The normal south route from the Italian side is usually snow-free during the summer.

So the south route starts from a parking at the road at around 1700 meters above the sea level, close to the village of San Giacomo. Hochfeiler can be climbed from the parking in one day. The time needed is 6 hours to the summit and 4 hours back.

The easier way is to stay in the Hochfeiler hut which is on the route. It can be reached in 3 hours. The hut has 94 beds and a winter room.

References 

 Heinrich Klier, Walter Klier: Alpine Club Guide Zillertaler Alpen, Rother Verlag, Munich, (1996), 
 Zeitschrift des Oesterreichischen Alpenvereins, Vol. II, page 127, Vienna, 1870/71
 Carl Diener in Eduard Richter (ed.): Die Erschließung der Ostalpen, Vol. III, Berlin, 1894
 Raimund von Klebelsberg: Geologie von Tirol, Berlin, 1935
 Alpine Club Map 1:25,000 series, Sheet 35/1
 Tabacco-Verlag, Udine, carta topografica 1:25,000, Sheet 037, Hochfeiler-Pfunderer Berge

External links 

 Hochfeiler - Gran Pilastro in Mountains for Everybody.
 Gran Pilastro - Hochfeiler in AllTrails

Mountains of the Alps
Mountains of Tyrol (state)
Mountains of South Tyrol
Alpine three-thousanders
Zillertal Alps
Austria–Italy border
International mountains of Europe